The 1985–86 NBA season was the Mavericks' 6th season in the NBA.

Dallas continued its strong play, finishing the season at 44-38, earning them the number 4 spot. They defeated the Utah Jazz in the opening round, but lost to the defending NBA champion Los Angeles Lakers, losing the series in six games.

Draft picks

Roster

Regular season

Season standings

z - clinched division title
y - clinched division title
x - clinched playoff spot

Record vs. opponents

Game log

|- align="center" bgcolor="#ccffcc"
| 1
| October 26, 1985
| Seattle
| W 101–95
|
|
|
| Reunion Arena
| 1–0
|- align="center" bgcolor="#ffcccc"
| 2
| October 29, 1985
| L.A. Lakers
| L 115–133
|
|
|
| Reunion Arena
| 1–1

|- align="center" bgcolor="#ffcccc"
| 3
| November 1, 1985
| @ San Antonio
| L 107–116
|
|
|
| HemisFair Arena
| 1–2
|- align="center" bgcolor="#ccffcc"
| 4
| November 2, 1985
| Sacramento
| W 119–113
|
|
|
| Reunion Arena
| 2–2
|- align="center" bgcolor="#ffcccc"
| 5
| November 5, 1985
| Portland
| L 109–111
|
|
|
| Reunion Arena
| 2–3
|- align="center" bgcolor="#ffcccc"
| 6
| November 7, 1985
| @ Denver
| L 99–131
|
|
|
| McNichols Sports Arena
| 2–4
|- align="center" bgcolor="#ffcccc"
| 7
| November 9, 1985
| Houston
| L 110–115
|
|
|
| Reunion Arena
| 2–5
|- align="center" bgcolor="#ffcccc"
| 8
| November 12, 1985
| @ Seattle
| L 90–109
|
|
|
| Seattle Center Coliseum
| 2–6
|- align="center" bgcolor="#ccffcc"
| 9
| November 13, 1985
| @ Utah
| W 115–100
|
|
|
| Salt Palace Acord Arena
| 3–6
|- align="center" bgcolor="#ccffcc"
| 10
| November 15, 1985
| New Jersey
| W 110–98
|
|
|
| Reunion Arena
| 4–6
|- align="center" bgcolor="#ffcccc"
| 11
| November 16, 1985
| @ Houston
| L 117–122
|
|
|
| The Summit
| 4–7
|- align="center" bgcolor="#ccffcc"
| 12
| November 19, 1985
| Phoenix
| W 123–119
|
|
|
| Reunion Arena
| 5–7
|- align="center" bgcolor="#ccffcc"
| 13
| November 23, 1985
| Indiana
| W 117–104
|
|
|
| Reunion Arena
| 6–7
|- align="center" bgcolor="#ccffcc"
| 14
| November 26, 1985
| Washington
| W 112–99
|
|
|
| Reunion Arena
| 7–7
|- align="center" bgcolor="#ccffcc"
| 15
| November 29, 1985
| Sacramento
| W 133–111
|
|
|
| Reunion Arena
| 8–7
|- align="center" bgcolor="#ccffcc"
| 16
| November 30, 1985
| L.A. Clippers
| W 124–115
|
|
|
| Reunion Arena
| 9–7

|- align="center" bgcolor="#ccffcc"
| 17
| December 3, 1985
| @ Golden State
| W 107–100
|
|
|
| Oakland-Alameda County Coliseum Arena
| 10–7
|- align="center" bgcolor="#ffcccc"
| 18
| December 5, 1985
| San Antonio
| L 116–120
|
|
|
| Reunion Arena
| 10–8
|- align="center" bgcolor="#ccffcc"
| 19
| December 7, 1985
| Golden State
| W 120–110
|
|
|
| Reunion Arena
| 11–8
|- align="center" bgcolor="#ffcccc"
| 20
| December 8, 1985
| @ L.A. Lakers
| L 119–125
|
|
|
| The Forum
| 11–9
|- align="center" bgcolor="#ffcccc"
| 21
| December 10, 1985
| @ L.A. Clippers
| L 118–120
|
|
|
| Los Angeles Memorial Sports Arena
| 11–10
|- align="center" bgcolor="#ffcccc"
| 22
| December 12, 1985
| @ Houston
| L 120–123
|
|
|
| The Summit
| 11–11
|- align="center" bgcolor="#ccffcc"
| 23
| December 14, 1985
| Denver
| W 127–100
|
|
|
| Reunion Arena
| 12–11
|- align="center" bgcolor="#ffcccc"
| 24
| December 18, 1985
| @ Boston
| L 117–137
|
|
|
| Boston Garden
| 12–12
|- align="center" bgcolor="#ccffcc"
| 25
| December 19, 19856:30p.m. CST
| @ Atlanta
| W 120–108
| Blackman (31)
| Perkins (14)
| Davis (12)
| The Omni5,867
| 13–12
|- align="center" bgcolor="#ffcccc"
| 26
| December 21, 1985
| @ Milwaukee
| L 107–132
|
|
|
| MECCA Arena
| 13–13
|- align="center" bgcolor="#ffcccc"
| 27
| December 22, 1985
| @ Cleveland
| L 105–119
|
|
|
| Richfield Coliseum
| 13–14
|- align="center" bgcolor="#ccffcc"
| 28
| December 26, 1985
| @ Phoenix
| W 105–98
|
|
|
| Arizona Veterans Memorial Coliseum
| 14–14
|- align="center" bgcolor="#ffcccc"
| 29
| December 27, 1985
| Portland
| L 133–142 (OT)
|
|
|
| Reunion Arena
| 14–15

|- align="center" bgcolor="#ccffcc"
| 30
| January 4, 1986
| Utah
| W 119–106
|
|
|
| Reunion Arena
| 15–15
|- align="center" bgcolor="#ffcccc"
| 31
| January 7, 1986
| @ Denver
| L 110–132
|
|
|
| McNichols Sports Arena
| 15–16
|- align="center" bgcolor="#ccffcc"
| 32
| January 10, 1986
| Phoenix
| W 117–104
|
|
|
| Reunion Arena
| 16–16
|- align="center" bgcolor="#ccffcc"
| 33
| January 11, 1986
| Golden State
| W 127–123 (OT)
|
|
|
| Reunion Arena
| 17–16
|- align="center" bgcolor="#ccffcc"
| 34
| January 13, 1986
| @ Seattle
| W 90–89
|
|
|
| Seattle Center Coliseum
| 18–16
|- align="center" bgcolor="#ffcccc"
| 35
| January 15, 1986
| New York
| L 112–116
|
|
|
| Reunion Arena
| 18–17
|- align="center" bgcolor="#ffcccc"
| 36
| January 17, 1986
| @ Utah
| L 112–139
|
|
|
| Salt Palace Acord Arena
| 18–18
|- align="center" bgcolor="#ccffcc"
| 37
| January 19, 1986
| Houston
| W 131–96
|
|
|
| Reunion Arena
| 19–18
|- align="center" bgcolor="#ffcccc"
| 38
| January 21, 1986
| @ Sacramento
| L 110–119
|
|
|
| ARCO Arena
| 19–19
|- align="center" bgcolor="#ffcccc"
| 39
| January 22, 1986
| L.A. Clippers
| L 118–131
|
|
|
| Reunion Arena
| 19–20
|- align="center" bgcolor="#ffcccc"
| 40
| January 24, 1986
| Detroit
| L 120–129
|
|
|
| Reunion Arena
| 19–21
|- align="center" bgcolor="#ccffcc"
| 41
| January 25, 1986
| @ San Antonio
| W 123–107
|
|
|
| HemisFair Arena
| 20–21
|- align="center" bgcolor="#ccffcc"
| 42
| January 27, 1986
| Chicago
| W 124–116
|
|
|
| Reunion Arena
| 21–21
|- align="center" bgcolor="#ccffcc"
| 43
| January 29, 1986
| San Antonio
| W 126–114
|
|
|
| Reunion Arena
| 22–21
|- align="center" bgcolor="#ccffcc"
| 44
| January 31, 1986
| Cleveland
| W 107–91
|
|
|
| Reunion Arena
| 23–21

|- align="center" bgcolor="#ccffcc"
| 45
| February 2, 1986
| Utah
| W 100–97
|
|
|
| Reunion Arena
| 24–21
|- align="center" bgcolor="#ffcccc"
| 46
| February 4, 1986
| @ L.A. Lakers
| L 102–110
|
|
|
| The Forum
| 24–22
|- align="center" bgcolor="#ccffcc"
| 47
| February 6, 1986
| @ Portland
| W 115–111
|
|
|
| Memorial Coliseum
| 25–22
|- align="center"
|colspan="9" bgcolor="#bbcaff"|All-Star Break
|- style="background:#cfc;"
|- bgcolor="#bbffbb"
|- align="center" bgcolor="#ccffcc"
| 48
| February 11, 1986
| @ San Antonio
| W 121–107
|
|
|
| HemisFair Arena
| 26–22
|- align="center" bgcolor="#ccffcc"
| 49
| February 12, 1986
| Denver
| W 117–110
|
|
|
| Reunion Arena
| 27–22
|- align="center" bgcolor="#ffcccc"
| 50
| February 14, 1986
| @ Detroit
| L 110–119
|
|
|
| Pontiac Silverdome
| 27–23
|- align="center" bgcolor="#ccffcc"
| 51
| February 16, 1986
| @ Chicago
| W 120–114
|
|
|
| Chicago Stadium
| 28–23
|- align="center" bgcolor="#ccffcc"
| 52
| February 17, 1986
| @ New Jersey
| W 126–124
|
|
|
| Brendan Byrne Arena
| 29–23
|- align="center" bgcolor="#ffcccc"
| 53
| February 19, 1986
| Milwaukee
| L 107–124
|
|
|
| Reunion Arena
| 29–24
|- align="center" bgcolor="#ffcccc"
| 54
| February 21, 1986
| Houston
| L 110–115
|
|
|
| Reunion Arena
| 29–25
|- align="center" bgcolor="#ffcccc"
| 55
| February 22, 1986
| @ Denver
| L 106–113
|
|
|
| McNichols Sports Arena
| 29–26
|- align="center" bgcolor="#ffcccc"
| 56
| February 24, 1986
| @ Houston
| L 105–110
|
|
|
| The Summit
| 29–27
|- align="center" bgcolor="#ffcccc"
| 57
| February 26, 1986
| L.A. Lakers
| L 116–119
|
|
|
| Reunion Arena
| 29–28
|- align="center" bgcolor="#ffcccc"
| 58
| February 28, 1986
| Philadelphia
| L 120–123
|
|
|
| Reunion Arena
| 29–29

|- align="center" bgcolor="#ccffcc"
| 59
| March 1, 1986
| Golden State
| W 119–110
|
|
|
| Reunion Arena
| 30–29
|- align="center" bgcolor="#ccffcc"
| 60
| March 3, 1986
| @ Phoenix
| W 139–138 (2OT)
|
|
|
| Arizona Veterans Memorial Coliseum
| 31–29
|- align="center" bgcolor="#ccffcc"
| 61
| March 6, 1986
| @ L.A. Clippers
| W 131–113
|
|
|
| Los Angeles Memorial Sports Arena
| 32–29
|- align="center" bgcolor="#ffcccc"
| 62
| March 7, 1986
| @ Portland
| L 114–125
|
|
|
| Memorial Coliseum
| 32–30
|- align="center" bgcolor="#ccffcc"
| 63
| March 9, 1986
| @ Sacramento
| W 117–102
|
|
|
| ARCO Arena
| 33–30
|- align="center" bgcolor="#ccffcc"
| 64
| March 10, 1986
| Boston
| W 116–115
|
|
|
| Reunion Arena
| 34–30
|- align="center" bgcolor="#ffcccc"
| 65
| March 12, 1986
| Sacramento
| L 120–127 (OT)
|
|
|
| Reunion Arena
| 34–31
|- align="center" bgcolor="#ccffcc"
| 66
| March 14, 1986
| Portland
| W 129–118
|
|
|
| Reunion Arena
| 35–31
|- align="center" bgcolor="#ccffcc"
| 67
| March 15, 1986
| Utah
| W 108–98
|
|
|
| Reunion Arena
| 36–31
|- align="center" bgcolor="#ccffcc"
| 68
| March 18, 1986
| San Antonio
| W 120–113
|
|
|
| Reunion Arena
| 37–31
|- align="center" bgcolor="#ccffcc"
| 69
| March 20, 1986
| @ Utah
| W 114–107
|
|
|
| Salt Palace Acord Arena
| 38–31
|- align="center" bgcolor="#ffcccc"
| 70
| March 21, 19867:30p.m. CST
| Atlanta
| L 103–107
| Blackman (23)
| Donaldson (14)
| Davis, Harper (6)
| Reunion Arena17,007
| 38–32
|- align="center" bgcolor="#ccffcc"
| 71
| March 24, 1986
| @ Indiana
| W 126–120
|
|
|
| Market Square Arena
| 39–32
|- align="center" bgcolor="#ffcccc"
| 72
| March 26, 1986
| @ Washington
| L 112–120
|
|
|
| Capital Centre
| 39–33
|- align="center" bgcolor="#ccffcc"
| 73
| March 27, 1986
| @ New York
| W 110–105
|
|
|
| Madison Square Garden
| 40–33
|- align="center" bgcolor="#ffcccc"
| 74
| March 30, 1986
| @ Philadelphia
| L 113–114
|
|
|
| The Spectrum
| 40–34

|- align="center" bgcolor="#ccffcc"
| 75
| April 1, 1986
| Phoenix
| W 128–98
|
|
|
| Reunion Arena
| 41–34
|- align="center" bgcolor="#ccffcc"
| 76
| April 3, 1986
| Denver
| W 115–114
|
|
|
| Reunion Arena
| 42–34
|- align="center" bgcolor="#ffcccc"
| 77
| April 5, 1986
| Seattle
| L 109–111
|
|
|
| Reunion Arena
| 42–35
|- align="center" bgcolor="#ffcccc"
| 78
| April 7, 1986
| @ Sacramento
| L 115–122
|
|
|
| ARCO Arena
| 42–36
|- align="center" bgcolor="#ffcccc"
| 79
| April 8, 1986
| @ Golden State
| L 115–129
|
|
|
| Oakland-Alameda County Coliseum Arena
| 42–37
|- align="center" bgcolor="#ccffcc"
| 80
| April 10, 1986
| @ Seattle
| W 115–109
|
|
|
| Seattle Center Coliseum
| 43–37
|- align="center" bgcolor="#ffcccc"
| 81
| April 12, 1986
| @ L.A. Clippers
| L 108–115
|
|
|
| Los Angeles Memorial Sports Arena
| 43–38
|- align="center" bgcolor="#ccffcc"
| 82
| April 13, 1986
| @ L.A. Lakers
| W 127–104
|
|
|
| The Forum
| 44–38

Playoffs

|- align="center" bgcolor="#ccffcc"
| 1
| April 18, 1986
| Utah
| W 101–93
| Rolando Blackman (25)
| Sam Perkins (15)
| Derek Harper (7)
| Reunion Arena17,007
| 1–0
|- align="center" bgcolor="#ccffcc"
| 2
| April 20, 1986
| Utah
| W 113–106
| Mark Aguirre (27)
| Sam Perkins (10)
| Aguirre, Harper (5)
| Reunion Arena17,007
| 2–0
|- align="center" bgcolor="#ffcccc"
| 3
| April 23, 1986
| @ Utah
| L 98–100
| James Donaldson (17)
| James Donaldson (20)
| Derek Harper (6)
| Salt Palace Acord Arena11,635
| 2–1
|- align="center" bgcolor="#ccffcc"
| 4
| April 25, 1986
| @ Utah
| W 117–113
| Sam Perkins (29)
| Sam Perkins (12)
| Mark Aguirre (8)
| Salt Palace Acord Arena12,683
| 3–1
|-

|- align="center" bgcolor="#ffcccc"
| 1
| April 27, 1986
| @ L.A. Lakers
| L 116–120
| Jay Vincent (10)
| James Donaldson (10)
| Derek Harper (9)
| The Forum17,505
| 0–1
|- align="center" bgcolor="#ffcccc"
| 2
| April 30, 1986
| @ L.A. Lakers
| L 113–117
| Mark Aguirre (28)
| Mark Aguirre (12)
| Derek Harper (16)
| The Forum17,505
| 0–2
|- align="center" bgcolor="#ccffcc"
| 3
| May 2, 1986
| L.A. Lakers
| W 110–108
| Mark Aguirre (27)
| James Donaldson (14)
| Mark Aguirre (8)
| Reunion Arena17,007
| 1–2
|- align="center" bgcolor="#ccffcc"
| 4
| May 4, 1986
| L.A. Lakers
| W 120–118
| Mark Aguirre (39)
| James Donaldson (11)
| Derek Harper (11)
| Reunion Arena17,007
| 2–2
|- align="center" bgcolor="#ffcccc"
| 5
| May 6, 1986
| @ L.A. Lakers
| L 113–116
| Mark Aguirre (27)
| James Donaldson (8)
| Derek Harper (9)
| The Forum17,505
| 2–3
|- align="center" bgcolor="#ffcccc"
| 6
| May 8, 1986
| L.A. Lakers
| L 107–120
| Mark Aguirre (28)
| James Donaldson (18)
| Rolando Blackman (8)
| Reunion Arena17,007
| 2–4
|-

Player statistics

Season

Playoffs

Awards and records
 Rolando Blackman, NBA All-Star Game

Transactions

References

See also
 1985-86 NBA season

Dallas Mavericks seasons
Dal
Dallas
Dallas